Love Revolution may refer to:

Albums
 Love Revolution, a 1997 album by NewSong, or its title track
 Love Revolution (Fabrice Morvan album), 2003, or the title track
 Love Revolution (Natalie Grant album), 2010, or the title track

Songs
"Love Revolution", song by Lenny Kravitz from It Is Time for a Love Revolution
"Love Revolution", song by Army of Lovers from Disco Extravaganza
"Love Revolution" (Will Young song), 2015
"Love Revolution" (Phixx song), 2004
"Love Revolution", song by Bitter:Sweet from Drama, 2008

Other uses
Love Revolution (web series), South Korean drama web series, 2020
Love Revolution (TV drama), a Japanese drama that aired in 2001 featuring Makiko Esumi